The A5112 is a road in Shropshire, England that runs north–south through the town of Shrewsbury. It runs around the town centre, to the east, and acts as a quicker route through the town than going via the town centre.

Starting north at Battlefield Island where it joins the A49  it consists of Battlefield Road, Whitchurch Road, Telford Way, Robertsford Way, Bage Way, Pritchard Way, Hazeldine Way and Hereford Road. The junctions along it are Battlefield Roundabout, Battlefield Road Crossroads, Harlescott Crossroads, Heathgates Roundabout, Telford Way Roundabout, Crowmere Roundabout, Rea Brook Roundabout, Sutton Park Roundabout, Meole Brace Island, Hereford Road Roundabout and Bayston Hill Roundabout where it rejoins the A49, as well as the A5 

The road crosses the River Severn on Telford Way Bridge and is a safe route during flooding of the river.

The road was for a short time in the late 1980s and early 1990s the A49, which now runs around a bypass of the town.

References 

Transport in Shropshire
Roads in England